Mokhdan (also Romanized as Mokhdān; also known as Moghdān and Mukhdān) is a village in Abkosh Rural District, Bord Khun District, Deyr County, Bushehr Province, Iran. At the 2006 census, its population was 877, in 181 families.

References 

Populated places in Deyr County